Railbox Company , founded in 1974, is a North American boxcar pooling company, and a subsidiary of the Chicago-based TTX Company. It was created to address a boxcar shortage in the United States in the 1970s.

The concept behind Railbox, as evidenced by the slogan, "Next Load, Any Road" was, because Railbox was jointly owned by many of the railroads as a privately owned cooperative, these boxcars were not subject to load/empty rules. Railbox cars could be assigned for service on any railroad in Canada, Mexico and the United States on lines where an AAR Plate-C loading gauge is permitted. Railbox purchased boxcars from many manufacturers, including American Car and Foundry Company, FMC Corporation, and Pullman-Standard (P-S).

See also
 Demurrage
 Railgon Company

References

1974 establishments in Illinois
Freight rolling stock
Rail cooperatives
Rolling stock leasing companies
Transport companies established in 1974